The men's madison competition at the 2022 UEC European Track Championships was held on 16 August 2022.

Results
250 laps (50 km) with 25 sprints were raced.

References

Men's madison
European Track Championships – Men's madison